Coronary artery disease (CAD), also called coronary heart disease (CHD), ischemic heart disease (IHD), myocardial ischemia, or simply heart disease, involves the reduction of blood flow to the heart muscle due to build-up of atherosclerotic plaque in the arteries of the heart. It is the most common of the cardiovascular diseases. Types include stable angina, unstable angina, myocardial infarction, and sudden cardiac death. A common symptom is chest pain or discomfort which may travel into the shoulder, arm, back, neck, or jaw. Occasionally it may feel like heartburn. Usually symptoms occur with exercise or emotional stress, last less than a few minutes, and improve with rest. Shortness of breath may also occur and sometimes no symptoms are present. In many cases, the first sign is a heart attack. Other complications include heart failure or an abnormal heartbeat.

Risk factors include high blood pressure, smoking, diabetes, lack of exercise, obesity, high blood cholesterol, poor diet, depression, and excessive alcohol consumption. A number of tests may help with diagnoses including: electrocardiogram, cardiac stress testing, coronary computed tomographic angiography, and coronary angiogram, among others.

Ways to reduce CAD risk include eating a healthy diet, regularly exercising, maintaining a healthy weight, and not smoking. Medications for diabetes, high cholesterol, or high blood pressure are sometimes used. There is limited evidence for screening people who are at low risk and do not have symptoms. Treatment involves the same measures as prevention. Additional medications such as antiplatelets (including aspirin), beta blockers, or nitroglycerin may be recommended. Procedures such as percutaneous coronary intervention (PCI) or coronary artery bypass surgery (CABG) may be used in severe disease. In those with stable CAD it is unclear if PCI or CABG in addition to the other treatments improves life expectancy or decreases heart attack risk.

In 2015, CAD affected 110 million people and resulted in 8.9 million deaths. It makes up 15.6% of all deaths, making it the most common cause of death globally. The risk of death from CAD for a given age decreased between 1980 and 2010, especially in developed countries. The number of cases of CAD for a given age also decreased between 1990 and 2010. In the United States in 2010, about 20% of those over 65 had CAD, while it was present in 7% of those 45 to 64, and 1.3% of those 18 to 45; rates were higher among men than women of a given age.

Signs and symptoms
The most common symptom is chest pain or discomfort that occurs regularly with activity, after eating, or at other predictable times; this phenomenon is termed stable angina and is associated with narrowing of the arteries of the heart. Angina also includes chest tightness, heaviness, pressure, numbness, fullness, or squeezing. Angina that changes in intensity, character or frequency is termed unstable. Unstable angina may precede myocardial infarction. In adults who go to the emergency department with an unclear cause of pain, about 30% have pain due to coronary artery disease. Angina, shortness of breath, sweating, nausea or vomiting, and lightheadedness are signs of a heart attack, or myocardial infarction, and immediate emergency medical services are crucial.

With advanced disease, the narrowing of coronary arteries reduces the supply of oxygen-rich blood flowing to the heart, which becomes more pronounced during strenuous activities during which the heart beats faster. For some, this causes severe symptoms, while others experience no symptoms at all.

Symptoms in women 

Symptoms in women can differ from those in men, and the most common symptom reported by women of all races is shortness of breath. Other symptoms more commonly reported by women than men are extreme fatigue, sleep disturbances, indigestion, and anxiety. However, some women do experience irregular heartbeat, dizziness, sweating, and nausea. Burning, pain, or pressure in the chest or upper abdomen that can travel to the arm or jaw can also be experienced in women, but it is less commonly reported by women than men. On average, women experience symptoms 10 years later than men. Women are less likely to recognize symptoms and seek treatment.

Risk factors
Coronary artery disease is characterized by heart problems that result from atherosclerosis. Atherosclerosis is a type of arteriosclerosis which is the “chronic inflammation of the arteries which causes them to harden and accumulate cholesterol plaques (atheromatous plaques) on the artery walls”. CAD has a number of well determined risk factors that contribute to atherosclerosis. These risk factors for CAD include “smoking, diabetes, high blood pressure (hypertension), abnormal (high) amounts of cholesterol and other fat in the blood (dyslipidemia), type 2 diabetes and being overweight or obese (having excess body fat)” due to lack of exercise and a poor diet. Some other risk factors include high blood pressure, smoking, diabetes, lack of exercise, obesity, high blood cholesterol, poor diet, depression, family history, psychological stress and excessive alcohol. About half of cases are linked to genetics. Smoking and obesity are associated with about 36% and 20% of cases, respectively. Smoking just one cigarette per day about doubles the risk of CAD. Lack of exercise has been linked to 7–12% of cases. Exposure to the herbicide Agent Orange may increase risk. Rheumatologic diseases such as rheumatoid arthritis, systemic lupus erythematosus, psoriasis, and psoriatic arthritis are independent risk factors as well.

Job stress appears to play a minor role accounting for about 3% of cases. In one study, women who were free of stress from work life saw an increase in the diameter of their blood vessels, leading to decreased progression of atherosclerosis. In contrast, women who had high levels of work-related stress experienced a decrease in the diameter of their blood vessels and significantly increased disease progression. Having a type A behavior pattern, a group of personality characteristics including time urgency, competitiveness, hostility, and impatience, is linked to an increased risk of coronary disease.

Blood fats
The consumption of different types of fats including trans unsaturated, saturated and trans in a diet “influences the level of cholesterol that is present in the bloodstream”. Unsaturated fats originate from plant sources (such as oils). There are two types of unsaturated fats, cis and trans isomers. Cis unsaturated fats are bent in molecular structure and trans are linear in structure. Saturated fats originate from animal sources (such as animal fats) and are also molecularly linear in structure.  The linear configurations of unsaturated trans and saturated fats allow them to easily accumulate and stack at the arterial walls when consumed in high amounts (and other positive measures towards physical health are not met).

Fats and cholesterol are insoluble in blood and thus are amalgamated with proteins to form lipoproteins for transport. Low density lipoproteins (LDL) transport cholesterol from the liver to the rest of the body and therefore raise blood cholesterol levels. The consumption of “saturated fats increases LDL levels within the body, thus raising blood cholesterol levels”.

High density lipoproteins (HDL) are considered ‘good’ lipoproteins as they search for excess cholesterol in the body and transport it back to the liver for disposal. Trans fats also “increase LDL levels whilst decreasing HDL levels within the body, significantly raising blood cholesterol levels”. 

High levels of cholesterol in the bloodstream lead to atherosclerosis. With increased levels of LDL in the bloodstream, “LDL particles will form deposits and accumulate within the arterial walls, which will lead to the development of plaques, restricting blood flow”. The resultant reduction in the heart's blood supply due to atherosclerosis in coronary arteries “causes shortness of breath, angina pectoris (chest pains that are usually relieved by rest), and potentially fatal heart attacks (myocardial infarctions)”.

Genetics
The heritability of coronary artery disease has been estimated between 40% and 60%. Genome-wide association studies have identified over 160 genetic susceptibility loci for coronary artery disease.

Other
 Endometriosis in women under the age of 40.
 Depression and hostility appear to be risks.
 The number of categories of adverse childhood experiences (psychological, physical, or sexual abuse; violence against mother; or living with household members who used substances, mentally ill, suicidal, or incarcerated) showed a graded correlation with the presence of adult diseases including coronary artery (ischemic heart) disease.
 Hemostatic factors: High levels of fibrinogen and coagulation factor VII are associated with an increased risk of CAD.
 Low hemoglobin.
 In the Asian population, the b fibrinogen gene G-455A polymorphism was associated with the risk of CAD.

Pathophysiology

Limitation of blood flow to the heart causes ischemia (cell starvation secondary to a lack of oxygen) of the heart's muscle cells. The heart's muscle cells may die from lack of oxygen and this is called a myocardial infarction (commonly referred to as a heart attack). It leads to damage, death, and eventual scarring of the heart muscle without regrowth of heart muscle cells. Chronic high-grade narrowing of the coronary arteries can induce transient ischemia which leads to the induction of a ventricular arrhythmia, which may terminate into a dangerous heart rhythm known as ventricular fibrillation, which often leads to death.

Typically, coronary artery disease occurs when part of the smooth, elastic lining inside a coronary artery (the arteries that supply blood to the heart muscle) develops atherosclerosis. With atherosclerosis, the artery's lining becomes hardened, stiffened, and accumulates deposits of calcium, fatty lipids, and abnormal inflammatory cells – to form a plaque. Calcium phosphate (hydroxyapatite) deposits in the muscular layer of the blood vessels appear to play a significant role in stiffening the arteries and inducing the early phase of coronary arteriosclerosis. This can be seen in a so-called metastatic mechanism of calciphylaxis as it occurs in chronic kidney disease and hemodialysis. Although these people have kidney dysfunction, almost fifty percent of them die due to coronary artery disease. Plaques can be thought of as large "pimples" that protrude into the channel of an artery, causing partial obstruction to blood flow. People with coronary artery disease might have just one or two plaques, or might have dozens distributed throughout their coronary arteries. A more severe form is chronic total occlusion (CTO) when a coronary artery is completely obstructed for more than 3 months.

Cardiac syndrome X is chest pain (angina pectoris) and chest discomfort in people who do not show signs of blockages in the larger coronary arteries of their hearts when an angiogram (coronary angiogram) is being performed. The exact cause of cardiac syndrome X is unknown. Explanations include microvascular dysfunction or epicardial atherosclerosis. For reasons that are not well understood, women are more likely than men to have it; however, hormones and other risk factors unique to women may play a role.

Diagnosis

For symptomatic people, stress echocardiography can be used to make a diagnosis for obstructive coronary artery disease. The use of echocardiography, stress cardiac imaging, and/or advanced non-invasive imaging is not recommended on individuals who are exhibiting no symptoms and are otherwise at low risk for developing coronary disease.

The diagnosis of "Cardiac Syndrome X" – the rare coronary artery disease that is more common in women, as mentioned, is a diagnosis of exclusion. Therefore, usually, the same tests are used as in any person with the suspected of having coronary artery disease:
 Baseline electrocardiography (ECG)
 Exercise ECG – Stress test
 Exercise radioisotope test (nuclear stress test, myocardial scintigraphy)
 Echocardiography (including stress echocardiography)
 Coronary angiography
 Intravascular ultrasound
 Magnetic resonance imaging (MRI)

The diagnosis of coronary disease underlying particular symptoms depends largely on the nature of the symptoms. The first investigation is an electrocardiogram (ECG/EKG), both for "stable" angina and acute coronary syndrome. An X-ray of the chest and blood tests may be performed.

Stable angina

Stable angina is the most common form of ischemic heart disease, and is associated with reduced quality of life and increased mortality. It is caused by epicardial coronary stenosis which results in reduced blood flow and oxygen supply to the myocardium. 
Stable angina is characterized as short-term chest pain during physical exertion caused by an imbalance between myocardial oxygen supply and metabolic oxygen demand. Various forms of cardiac stress tests may be used to induce both symptoms and detect changes by way of electrocardiography (using an ECG), echocardiography (using ultrasound of the heart) or scintigraphy (using uptake of radionuclide by the heart muscle). If part of the heart seems to receive an insufficient blood supply, coronary angiography may be used to identify stenosis of the coronary arteries and suitability for angioplasty or bypass surgery.

In minor to moderate cases, nitroglycerine may be used to alleviate acute symptoms of stable angina or may be used immediately prior to exertion to prevent the onset of angina. Sublingual nitroglycerine is most commonly used to provide rapid relief for acute angina attacks and as a complement to anti-anginal treatments in patients with refractory and recurrent angina. When nitroglycerine enters the bloodstream, it forms free radical nitric oxide, or NO, which activates guanylate cyclase and in turn stimulates the release of cyclic GMP. This molecular signaling stimulates smooth muscle relaxation, ultimately resulting in vasodilation and consequently improved blood flow to regions of the heart affected by atherosclerotic plaque.

Stable coronary artery disease (SCAD) is also often called stable ischemic heart disease (SIHD). A 2015 monograph explains that "Regardless of the nomenclature, stable angina is the chief manifestation of SIHD or SCAD." There are U.S. and European clinical practice guidelines for SIHD/SCAD.

Acute coronary syndrome

Diagnosis of acute coronary syndrome generally takes place in the emergency department, where ECGs may be performed sequentially to identify "evolving changes" (indicating ongoing damage to the heart muscle). Diagnosis is clear-cut if ECGs show elevation of the "ST segment", which in the context of severe typical chest pain is strongly indicative of an acute myocardial infarction (MI); this is termed a STEMI (ST-elevation MI) and is treated as an emergency with either urgent coronary angiography and percutaneous coronary intervention (angioplasty with or without stent insertion) or with thrombolysis ("clot buster" medication), whichever is available. In the absence of ST-segment elevation, heart damage is detected by cardiac markers (blood tests that identify heart muscle damage). If there is evidence of damage (infarction), the chest pain is attributed to a "non-ST elevation MI" (NSTEMI). If there is no evidence of damage, the term "unstable angina" is used. This process usually necessitates hospital admission and close observation on a coronary care unit for possible complications (such as cardiac arrhythmias – irregularities in the heart rate). Depending on the risk assessment, stress testing or angiography may be used to identify and treat coronary artery disease in patients who have had an NSTEMI or unstable angina.

Risk assessment
There are various risk assessment systems for determining the risk of coronary artery disease, with various emphasis on different variables above. A notable example is Framingham Score, used in the Framingham Heart Study. It is mainly based on age, gender, diabetes, total cholesterol, HDL cholesterol, tobacco smoking, and systolic blood pressure. When it comes to predicting risk in younger adults (18–39 years old), Framingham Risk Score remains below 10-12% for all deciles of baseline-predicted risk.

Polygenic score is another way of risk assessment. In one study the relative risk of incident coronary events was 91% higher among participants at high genetic risk than among those at low genetic risk.

Prevention
Up to 90% of cardiovascular disease may be preventable if established risk factors are avoided. Prevention involves adequate physical exercise, decreasing obesity, treating high blood pressure, eating a healthy diet, decreasing cholesterol levels, and stopping smoking. Medications and exercise are roughly equally effective. High levels of physical activity reduce the risk of coronary artery disease by about 25%. Life's Essential 8 are the key measures for improving and maintaining cardiovascular health, as defined by the American Heart Association. AHA added sleep as a factor influencing heart health in 2022.

Most guidelines recommend combining these preventive strategies. A 2015 Cochrane Review found some evidence that counseling and education to bring about behavioral change might help in high-risk groups. However, there was insufficient evidence to show an effect on mortality or actual cardiovascular events.

In diabetes mellitus, there is little evidence that very tight blood sugar control improves cardiac risk although improved sugar control appears to decrease other problems such as kidney failure and blindness. The World Health Organization (WHO) recommends "low to moderate alcohol intake" to reduce risk of coronary artery disease while high intake increases the risk.

Diet

A diet high in fruits and vegetables decreases the risk of cardiovascular disease and death. Vegetarians have a lower risk of heart disease, possibly due to their greater consumption of fruits and vegetables. Evidence also suggests that the Mediterranean diet and a high fiber diet lower the risk.

The consumption of trans fat (commonly found in hydrogenated products such as margarine) has been shown to cause a precursor to atherosclerosis and increase the risk of coronary artery disease.

Evidence does not support a beneficial role for omega-3 fatty acid supplementation in preventing cardiovascular disease (including myocardial infarction and sudden cardiac death). There is tentative evidence that intake of menaquinone (Vitamin K2), but not phylloquinone (Vitamin K1), may reduce the risk of CAD mortality.

Secondary prevention
Secondary prevention is preventing further sequelae of already established disease. Effective lifestyle changes include:
 Weight control
 Smoking cessation
 Avoiding the consumption of trans fats (in partially hydrogenated oils)
 Decreasing psychosocial stress
 Exercise

Aerobic exercise, like walking, jogging, or swimming, can reduce the risk of mortality from coronary artery disease. Aerobic exercise can help decrease blood pressure and the amount of blood cholesterol (LDL) over time. It also increases HDL cholesterol.

Although exercise is beneficial, it is unclear whether doctors should spend time counseling patients to exercise. The U.S. Preventive Services Task Force found "insufficient evidence" to recommend that doctors counsel patients on exercise but "it did not review the evidence for the effectiveness of physical activity to reduce chronic disease, morbidity, and mortality", only the effectiveness of counseling itself. The American Heart Association, based on a non-systematic review, recommends that doctors counsel patients on exercise.

Psychological symptoms are common in people with CHD, and while many psychological treatments may be offered following cardiac events, there is no evidence that they change mortality, the risk of revascularization procedures, or the rate of non-fatal myocardial infarction.

Antibiotics for secondary prevention of coronary heart disease

Antibiotics may help patients with coronary disease to reduce the risk of heart attacks and strokes. However, the latest evidence suggests that antibiotics for secondary prevention of coronary heart disease are harmful with increased mortality and occurrence of stroke. So, the use of antibiotics is not currently supported for preventing secondary coronary heart disease.

Neuropsychological Assessment
A thorough systematic review found that indeed there is a link between a CHD condition and brain dysfunction in females/women. Consequently, since research is showing that cardiovascular diseases, like CHD, can play a role as a precursor for dementia, like Alzheimer's disease, individuals with CHD should have a neuropsychological assessment.

Treatment
There are a number of treatment options for coronary artery disease:
 Lifestyle changes
 Medical treatment – commonly prescribed drugs (e.g., cholesterol lowering medications, beta-blockers, nitroglycerin, calcium channel blockers, etc.);
 Coronary interventions as angioplasty and coronary stent;
 Coronary artery bypass grafting (CABG)

Medications
 Statins, which reduce cholesterol, reduce the risk of coronary artery disease
 Nitroglycerin
 Calcium channel blockers and/or beta-blockers
 Antiplatelet drugs such as aspirin

It is recommended that blood pressure typically be reduced to less than 140/90 mmHg. The diastolic blood pressure however should not be lower than 60 mmHg. Beta blockers are recommended first line for this use.

Aspirin
In those with no previous history of heart disease, aspirin decreases the risk of a myocardial infarction but does not change the overall risk of death. It is thus recommended only in adults who are at increased risk for coronary artery disease where increased risk is defined as "men older than 90 years of age, postmenopausal women, and younger persons with risk factors for coronary artery disease (for example, hypertension, diabetes, or smoking) who are at increased risk for heart disease and may wish to consider aspirin therapy". More specifically, high-risk persons are "those with a 5-year risk ≥ 3%".

Anti-platelet therapy
Clopidogrel plus aspirin (dual anti-platelet therapy) reduces cardiovascular events more than aspirin alone in those with a STEMI. In others at high risk but not having an acute event, the evidence is weak. Specifically, its use does not change the risk of death in this group. In those who have had a stent, more than 12 months of clopidogrel plus aspirin does not affect the risk of death.

Surgery
Revascularization for acute coronary syndrome has a mortality benefit. Percutaneous revascularization for stable ischaemic heart disease does not appear to have benefits over medical therapy alone. In those with disease in more than one artery, coronary artery bypass grafts appear better than percutaneous coronary interventions. Newer "anaortic" or no-touch off-pump coronary artery revascularization techniques have shown reduced postoperative stroke rates comparable to percutaneous coronary intervention. Hybrid coronary revascularization has also been shown to be a safe and feasible procedure that may offer some advantages over conventional CABG though it is more expensive.

Epidemiology

As of 2010, CAD was the leading cause of death globally resulting in over 7 million deaths. This increased from 5.2 million deaths from CAD worldwide in 1990. It may affect individuals at any age but becomes dramatically more common at progressively older ages, with approximately a tripling with each decade of life. Males are affected more often than females.

It is estimated that 60% of the world's cardiovascular disease burden will occur in the South Asian subcontinent despite only accounting for 20% of the world's population. This may be secondary to a combination of genetic predisposition and environmental factors. Organizations such as the Indian Heart Association are working with the World Heart Federation to raise awareness about this issue.

Coronary artery disease is the leading cause of death for both men and women and accounts for approximately 600,000 deaths in the United States every year. According to present trends in the United States, half of healthy 40-year-old men will develop CAD in the future, and one in three healthy 40-year-old women. It is the most common reason for death of men and women over 20 years of age in the United States.

Society and culture

Names
Other terms sometimes used for this condition are "hardening of the arteries" and "narrowing of the arteries". In Latin it is known as morbus ischaemicus cordis (MIC).

Support groups
The Infarct Combat Project (ICP) is an international nonprofit organization founded in 1998 which tries to decrease ischemic heart diseases through education and research.

Industry influence on research
In 2016 research into the archives of the Sugar Association, the trade association for the sugar industry in the US, had sponsored an influential literature review published in 1965 in the New England Journal of Medicine that downplayed early findings about the role of a diet heavy in sugar in the development of CAD and emphasized the role of fat; that review influenced decades of research funding and guidance on healthy eating.

Research

Research efforts are focused on new angiogenic treatment modalities and various (adult) stem-cell therapies. A region on chromosome 17 was confined to families with multiple cases of myocardial infarction. Other genome-wide studies have identified a firm risk variant on chromosome 9 (9p21.3). However, these and other loci are found in intergenic segments and need further research in understanding how the phenotype is affected.

A more controversial link is that between Chlamydophila pneumoniae infection and atherosclerosis. While this intracellular organism has been demonstrated in atherosclerotic plaques, evidence is inconclusive as to whether it can be considered a causative factor. Treatment with antibiotics in patients with proven atherosclerosis has not demonstrated a decreased risk of heart attacks or other coronary vascular diseases.

Since the 1990s the search for new treatment options for coronary artery disease patients, particularly for so called "no-option" coronary patients, focused on usage of angiogenesis and (adult) stem cell therapies. Numerous clinical trials were performed, either applying protein (angiogenic growth factor) therapies, such as FGF-1 or VEGF, or cell therapies using different kinds of adult stem cell populations. Research is still going on – with first promising results particularly for FGF-1 and utilization of endothelial progenitor cells.

Myeloperoxidase has been proposed as a biomarker.

Plant-based nutrition has been suggested as a way to reverse coronary artery disease, but strong evidence is still lacking for claims of potential benefits.

Several immunosuppressive drugs targeting the chronic inflammation in coronary artery disease have been tested.

References

External links 

 Risk Assessment of having a heart attack or dying of coronary artery disease, from the American Heart Association.
 

Aging-associated diseases
Heart diseases
Ischemic heart diseases
Wikipedia medicine articles ready to translate
Wikipedia emergency medicine articles ready to translate